"Summertime Summertime" is the 1986 debut single by freestyle singer Nocera, from her 1987 debut album Over the Rainbow. Nocera co-wrote and co-produced the song with Floyd Fisher.

Background
"Summertime Summertime" also featured contributions from Kurtis Mantronik (who added production mixes) and Chep Nunez (edits). In 1989, the single was re-released in Europe with new mixes done by Nunez and Todd Terry, and engineered by Norty Cotto.

Chart performance
This single was Nocera's well-known track and her signature song, peaking at number 2 on [[Dance Club Songs|Billboard'''s Dance/Disco Club Play]] chart in 1986. 

Track listing
US 12" singlesingle release from Discogs

Germany single

Corina version

In 1997, Corina recorded a new version of "Summertime Summertime" for the So So Def Bass All Stars Vol. 2 compilation. The track and accompanying video featured additional Spanish lyrics that were written by Corina as well as a sampling of Nocera's original recording and Kraftwerk's "Numbers" as remixed in the video by an uncredited Lil Jon.

Track listing
US 12" singlesingle release from Discogs

Reception
In a 2006 interview, Nocera offered her opinion on Corina's version, which she had mixed feelings: "I have no relationship with Corina. We’ve never even gone out for coffee. It kind of hurt my feelings that she didn’t even return my calls to go out for a drink. But, besides all of the personal stuff, there is a magic in the original song that can’t be recaptured. Corina’s version was fun and playful though. I’m honored that she chose my song for a remake and, also, put some extra money in my pocket!".

References

External links
Nocera's Performance from Dance Party USA'' (1986)
Nocera's 2016 performance at YouTube
Corina's Version at YouTube

1986 debut singles
1997 singles
Nocera (singer) songs
Corina (singer) songs
1986 songs
Sleeping Bag Records singles
Columbia Records singles